The Caledonian Railway 439 Class is a class of 0-4-4T steam locomotive.  It was a development of earlier Caledonian Railway 0-4-4T locomotives, including the 19 Class and 92 Class, and predecessor of the 431 Class.  The 439 Class was introduced by John F. McIntosh in 1900 and a modified version was introduced by William Pickersgill in 1915.

Introduction

Ninety-two engines of the class were built between 1900 and 1925, a few under LMS auspices.  Seventy-four Class 439s passed into British Railways ownership in 1948 and they were numbered 55159-55236 (with gaps).

Earlier versions

 19 Class Introduced 1895 
 92 Class Introduced 1897, developed from 29 Class 0-6-0T

The 19 and 92 Classes were originally fitted with condensing apparatus for use on Glasgow Central Low Level lines.  Twenty-four of them passed into British Railways ownership and they were numbered 55119-55146 (with gaps).

Later versions

In 1922 Pickersgill introduced the 431 Class with larger cylinders and cast-iron front buffer beam for banking.  The idea was, presumably, to move the centre of gravity forwards and put more weight on the driving wheels.  However, it seems strange to use a large-wheeled 0-4-4T (rather than a small-wheeled 0-6-0T) for banking.  The 431 Class was numbered 431–434 by the Caledonian, 15237–15240 by the LMS, and 55237–55240 by British Railways.

In 1925 the LMS introduced their own version of the 439 Class and these were numbered 55260-55269 by British Railways.

Preservation

One example, CR 419, (later LMS number 15189, BR 55189) has been preserved and is the flagship locomotive of the Scottish Railway Preservation Society.

See also
 Caledonian Railway 0-4-4T
 Locomotives of the Caledonian Railway

References

Sources

 Ian Allan ABC of British Railways Locomotives, 1948 edition, part 3, pages 45-46 and 1961 edition, part 3, page 54

External links 
 Photos of 55189
 Class 2P-H Details at Rail UK

439
0-4-4T locomotives
Railway locomotives introduced in 1895
Standard gauge steam locomotives of Great Britain
Passenger locomotives